Üsküdar University, founded by the Human Values and Mental Health Foundation, is the first thematic university of Turkey in the field of Behavioral Health and Sciences.

History 
At the beginning, NP Group opened the Turkish branch of Memory Centers of America on May 25, 1999, on Baghdad Street in Istanbul with the participation of the President of the Republic, Süleyman Demirel. Memory Centers, having accomplished implementing the "Brain check-up" and "Magnetic stimulation Treatment (TMS) (first in Turkey), continue to uninterruptedly offer new treatment methods in psychiatry effectively with its highly qualified, expert staff.

Memory Center adopted relying on scientific measurements in the diagnosis and the treatment of brain functions dealing with neurological and psychiatric diseases, realizing one year later, the second stage opening of its Child and Adolescent Psychiatry Unit on October 3, 2000 with the participation of Wenon Wells, the President of "Memory Center of America".

In February 2003, NP GROUP put into service a five-story center for Adult Neurology and Psychiatry in Feneryolu, and allocated the villa behind it for young children and adolescent psychiatry.

Since November 2006, NP GROUP has been using functional and volumetric MR visualization techniques. Then on March 20, 2007, they established the first and the only Neuropsychiatry Hospital in Turkey, and began meeting the needs for an in-patient institution and with the participation of Bülent Arınç, President of Grand National Assembly of Turkey, inaugurated the hospital.

In June 2009, NP GROUP started the first Clinical Pharmacogenetic Laboratory in Neuropsychiatry in Turkey, and on August 10, 2009, established the service of Child and Adolescent Psychology and adult psychiatry at NP ISTANBUL Polyclinic at Etiler.

Üsküdar University has been officially established since March 3, 2011.

Faculties 
Faculty of Engineering and Natural Sciences
Computer Engineering
Bioengineering
Industrial and Systems Engineering
Molecular Biology and Genetics (Turkish)
Molecular Biology and Genetics (English)
Faculty of Humanities and Social Sciences'
Philosophy
Psychology
Psychology (English)
Political Science and International Relations
Sociology
Faculty of Health Sciences
Child Development
Speech and Language Therapy
Ergotherapy
Occupational Health and Safety
Nursing
Healthcare Management
Social Work
Audiology
Physiotherapy and Rehabilitation
Faculty of Communication studies|Communications
Media and Communication Systems
Advertising Design and Communication
New Media and Journalism
Radio, Television and Cinema
Visual Communication Design
School of Medicine 

School of Dentistry

Graduate Institutes 
Institute of Science and Technology
Department of Molecular Biology Graduate Program
Department of Bioengineering Master's Program
Institute of Health Graduate Studies
Department of Nursing Doctoral Program
Hospital Management Graduate Program
Department of Nursing Graduate Programs
Occupational Health and Safety Master's Program
Neuroscience Graduate Program
Master of Social Work Program
Institute of Social Sciences Graduate Studies
Clinical Psychology Masters Program
Neuromarketing Graduate Program
Applied Psychology Graduate Program
Institute of Tasawwuf Sufi Studies

Vocational Schools of Higher Education 
 Oral and Dental Health
Surgery Services
Anesthesia
Biomedical Device Technology
Child Development
Dental Prosthesis Technology
Dialysis
Pharmacy Services
Electroneurophysiology
Care and Rehabilitation Program Students With Disabilities
Physical Therapy
Food Technology
First And Emergency Aid
Worker's Health And Job Safety
Audiometry
Opticians
Orthopedic Prosthetic And Orthotic
Perfusion Techniques
Radiotherapy
Health Services Management
Social Services
Medical And Aromatic Plants
Medical Documentation And Secretariat
Medical Laboratory Techniques
Medical Promotion and Marketing
Medical Imaging Techniques
Elderly Care Services

References

External links
 Uskudar University (official web site)

See also 
 List of universities in Turkey

Universities and colleges in Istanbul
Educational institutions established in 2011
Private universities and colleges in Turkey
Üsküdar
2011 establishments in Turkey